Emlyn Price Davies (15 January 1922 – 6 September 2016) was a Welsh international rugby union prop who played club rugby for Swansea and Aberavon and county rugby for Glamorgan. He was capped for Wales national rugby union team on two occasions.

Davies played for a wide variety of club teams, but it was while he was with Aberavon that he was selected to play for Wales against the touring, 1947 Australian team. It was a dull encounter played out between the forwards, but Davies finished on the winning side as Wales won 6–0. Davies gained his second and final cap in the 1948 Five Nations Championship in the last game of the tournament against Ireland. It was a close game, but Ireland won 6–3, and won the Triple Crown for the first time since 1899. He died on 6 September 2016 at the age of 94.

International matches played
Wales
  1947
   1948

Bibliography

References

1922 births
2016 deaths
Aberavon RFC players
Cwmavon RFC players
Rugby union players from Port Talbot
Rugby union props
Swansea RFC players
Wales international rugby union players
Welsh rugby union players